Indiana's 6th congressional district is a congressional district in the U.S. state of Indiana. The district takes in a portion of eastern and central Indiana as of the 2020 census, including Columbus and Richmond, some of Cincinnati's Indiana suburbs, most of Indianapolis' southern suburbs, and a sliver of Indianapolis itself.

The district is currently represented by Republican Greg Pence. He is the brother of former U.S. Vice President, Mike Pence, who represented this district before serving as Governor of Indiana and Vice President of the United States. Greg Pence was elected on November 6, 2018 after the previous incumbent, Luke Messer, announced his retirement to run for the U.S. Senate in 2018. With a Cook Partisan Voting Index rating of R+19, it is tied for the most Republican district in Indiana.

Election results from presidential races

List of members representing the district

Composition 

As of 2023, Indiana's 6th congressional district is located in eastern and Central Indiana. It includes Fayette, Hancock, Henry, Johnson, Rush, Shelby, Union, and Wayne Counties, and parts of Bartholomew, Marion, and Randolph Counties.

Bartholomew County is split between this district and the 9th district. They are partitioned by the borders of Indiana County Rd West 300 South and Indiana County Rd 400 South. The 6th district takes in most of the city of Columbus, and the 9 townships of Camp Atterbury, Clay, Clifty, Columbus Township, Flat Rock, German, Harrison, Haw Creek, and Rock Creek, and part of Sand Creek.

Marion County is split between this district and the 7th district. They are partitioned by Stafford Rd, West Troy Ave, and East Troy Ave. The 6th district takes in most of the city of Beech Grove as well as the south side of Indianapolis, encompassing Decatur, Perry, and Franklin Townships. 

Several eastern and southern Indianapolis suburbs, including Greenwood, Franklin, and Greenfield, are also in the 6th district.

Randolph County is split between this district and the 3rd district. They are partitioned by Indiana State Rt 32. The 6th district takes in the 4 townships of Greensfork, Stoney Creek, Union, and Washington, as well as half of White River and Wayne Townships.

Largest Cities
Cities in the district with more than 10,000 residents as of the 2020 Census.
 Greenwood - 63,830
 Columbus - 50,474
 Richmond - 35,720
 Franklin - 25,313
 Greenfield - 23,488
 Shelbyville - 20,067
 New Castle - 17,396
 Beech Grove - 14,192
 Connersville - 13,481

Election results

2002

2004

2006

2008

2010

2012

2014

2016

2018

2020

Historical district boundaries

See also

Indiana's congressional districts
List of United States congressional districts

Notes

References

 Congressional Biographical Directory of the United States 1774–present

06
Constituencies established in 1833
1833 establishments in Indiana